Matveyev Kurgan is a rural locality (a settlement) and the administrative center of Matveyevo-Kurgansky District, Rostov Oblast, Russia.

Demographics 
Its population has grown over the decades:

History 

The Russians started settling this territory district in the beginning of the 18th century under the orders of Peter I. The Mius river basin was settled especially in the second half of the 1770s and early 1780s. Thus, the history of the village of Matveev Kurgan dates to 1780. It was founded by the Cossack Ataman Ilovaiskiy. 

These places are mentioned in the legend of "The Word about Igor's regiment". The eighteenth century saw the colonization of Russia's southern territories. Runaway serfs who were attracted by the favorable climate and proximity to seas and rivers migrated to Matveyev Kurgan. Matvey was one of those settlers. He was known as "Terrible", because he was a terror to all passing carts. This legendary image is reminiscent of Robin Hood. Like the latter Matvey robbed passing merchants and helped the poor, for which he was hated by the first and idolized by the second. Matvey lived in the steppes of Primiusye, uniting hundreds of like-minded people, and became their leader – Ataman. According to the legend explaining the name of the village, Matvey was killed and buried on the mound on the river. According to one version, the building of the district hospital stands on his grave, while another version points to the office the Center of employment. 

The Russian kurgan has another meaning – “grave”. The settlement Matveev Kurgan was formed around the ataman’s mound. 

In September 1937 Matveev Kurgan became part of Rostov region. The Great Patriotic War interrupted the peaceful labour of local inhabitants. In October 1941 German troops captured the area. Soon a powerful line of defense called the Mius-front was built and was the scene of fierce fighting. Having freed Rostov-on-Don on February 14, 1943, the troops of the Southern Front rushed to the Mius, and on February 17 Matveev Kurgan was liberated.

Geography 
The village is located in the northwestern part of Rostov Oblast on the left bank of the Mius. A railway station is sited 91 km from Rostov-on-Don, 45 km from Taganrog.

Culture 
Matveev Kurgan is known for monuments of military glory: Monument "Anchor" Matveev Kurgan, Monument "Motherland" Matveev Kurgan, Monument "Regulator Maria" Matveev Kurgan, Monument "Soldier" Matveev Kurgan, Monument "Tank T-34" Matveev Kurgan. Most of them became landmarks of the district, attracting tourists.

References

Notes

Sources

 Pugaev G.K. Years and people. Historical records; Taganrog, 2010, 212 p.
 Cities and districts of the Rostov region: local history essays. Mironov E.V, Arutunova E.I...; Rostov-on-Don, 1987, 320 p.
 Matveevo-Kurganskiy district, 90 years; L. Esina; Taganrog, 2013, 120 p.

Rural localities in Rostov Oblast